Events in the year 1934 in Bulgaria.

Incumbents 
Monarch – Boris III

Events 

 The Bulgarian coup d'état of 1934 (also called the 19 May coup d'état) took place.
 The National Art Gallery of Bulgaria was established.

References 

 
1930s in Bulgaria
Years of the 20th century in Bulgaria
Bulgaria
Bulgaria